The von Treskow family is a prominent German aristocratic family, that descended as a branch of the medieval ("Uradel") House of Tresckow. The family rose to fame in Prussia due to their large landholdings and business ventures, resulting in many streets and boulevards being named after the family today.

History 
The Treskow branch of the medieval House of Tresckow descends from Sigmund Otto Joseph von Treskow (1756–1825) and was formally recognized by King Frederick William II of Prussia in 1797. U.S. President George Washington gave Sigismund Otto Joseph 4000 acres of woods along the Mississippi River in return for providing goods to the Continental Army. Treskow also financed Napoleon Bonaparte's army during the French Revolution, for which he was given the Regent Diamond. The diamond, which is one of the world's largest and was worn by various French kings and emperors in their crowns, is now on display at the Louvre as part of the French Crown Jewels. Napoleon later visited the family at their Owinska and Radojewo palaces and proctected the Treskow family's estates from destruction during his later campaigns.

The descendants of Sigismund Otto Joseph von Treskow formed their own branches of the family, respectively, and acquired additional estates and palaces. Owinska Palace is known to be a remarkable early work of the famous architect Karl Friedrich Schinkel, whose most famous works include the Old Museum and Concert Hall in Berlin. European aristocrats, such as Prince Antoni Radziwiłł, Princess Louise of Prussia and King Frederick William IV, came to the family's estate to enjoy the grounds and architecture.

Friedrichsfelde Palace and its surrounding lands were acquired by Carl von Treskow in 1812, who went on to buy nine more surrounding country estates, and was the family's Berlin residence until the Soviet invasion in 1945. The Berlin district of Karlshorst is named after Carl von Treskow, who started its development into a mansion colony in 1825. Sigismund von Treskow, who lived in the palace from 1880, continued the development of the district and the nearby Karlshorst racecourse. Treskowallee, a major avenue in Berlin, was named after Carl von Treskow.

Streets and places 

 Am Treskower Berg in Treskow (Neuruppin)
 Elisabeth-Treskow-Square in Cologne
 Treskowallee in Berlin, major boulevard home to university and major rail stations.
 Treskow Bridge in Berlin Treptow-Köpenick, bridge over the Spree river.
 Treskowstraße in Berlin-Heinersdorf
 Treskowstraße in Berlin-Mahlsdorf
 Treskowstraße in Berlin-Niederschönhausen
 Treskowstraße in Berlin-Oberschöneweide
 Treskowstraße in Berlin-Tegel
 Treskower Ring in Treskow (Neuruppin)
 Von-Treskow-Pfad in Ilmenau
 Treskow-Höfe ("Treskow Courts") in Berlin-Karlshorst, award-winning residential development.

Estates

Austria 

 Klaus Castle, bought by Sigismund von Treskow and given to his niece Ursula von Sydow, whose family still owns the castle today.

Berlin 
 Friedrichsfelde Palace, home to the Friedrichsfelde branch of the Family until the Soviet Invasion in 1945 and home to the family's private cemetery.
 Maison George, built by Benjamin George and given to the Treskow family in 1920: Residential building with palatial apartments in central Berlin. Former residents and visitors include Wilhelm von Humboldt, U.S. President John Quincy Adams and Bettina von Arnim, as well as various ambassadors.

Brandeburg 
 Altenplathow Manor
 Dahlwitz Palace, built in 1856 for Heinrich von Treskow
 Kade Manor
 Milow Manor

France 
 
 Chateau Livron in Vétraz-Monthoux near Geneva

Poland 

 Bernau Manor (Bolechowo)
 Chludowo Palace
 Chodowo Palace, built in 1836 for Hermann von Treskow
 Domanikowo Manor, built in 1836 for Hermann von Treskow
 Giesenbrügge Estate (Gizyn)
 Hohenpetersdorff Palace (Pietrzykow)
 Jürgensburg Manor (Grocholin)
 Krähwinkel Manor (Wronczyn),
 Lechlin Palace
 Neuhaus Palace (Nowy Dwor)
 Niederbaumgarten Palace (Sady Dolne), built in 1844 for Otto Sigismund von Treskow
 Nieschawa Palace (Nieszawa)
 Nordheim Palace and Manor (Morasko)
 Owinska Palace, built for Sigmund Otto Joseph von Treskow by Karl Friedrich Schinkel
 Radojewo Palace, built for Sigmund Otto Joseph von Treskow
 Strelcze Manor, built in 1840 for Carl von Treskow
 Treskow Palace (Biedrusko), built in 1880 for Albrecht von Treskow
 Vogelsberg Manor (Nowa Sol), built in 1935 for Albrecht von Treskow by the architect Fritz Schopohl
 von Treskow Palace (Strykowo), built in 1900 for Hans von Treskow, now "Hotel Schloss von Treskow" (polish: Zamek von Treskov)

References 

German noble families
Prussian nobility
Treskow family